The Kinkaid School is a PK-12 non-sectarian school in Piney Point Village, Texas, United States in Greater Houston.

The Kinkaid School is the oldest independent coeducational school in Greater Houston. The student body is divided into the Lower School (PreK - 4th Grade), the Middle School (5th grade - 8th grade) and the Upper School (9th grade - 12th grade). The school motto is: "Lux per Scientiam" meaning, "Light through Knowledge." The School colors are purple and gold, and the school mascot is the falcon. The school is accredited by the Independent Schools Association of the Southwest.

The current head of school is Jonathan Eades. The current chairman of the Board of Trustees is Kenneth D. Cowan.

A feature of Kinkaid's Upper School is its Interim Term, which provides three weeks in January for teacher-designed and student-selected curricula. Teachers at the School provide classes that they would otherwise not be able to teach as part of the normal semester, including military histories of the Civil War and World War II, introductory courses in digital programming and engineering, courses in photography and art history, and a course in Disney films. Students may also go on international trips sponsored by the school, such as tours of China, Italy and Greece; homestays in Mexico and France are also possibilities. Finally, the School provides connections with companies throughout the greater Houston area and, if the students prefer, throughout the world, in which its senior students may find internships.

Athletics
Kinkaid sports teams compete in the Southwest Preparatory Conference of the Independent Schools Association in the Southwest. An alumni event is the Kinkaid vs. St. John's School football game played each year at Rice Stadium, with the winning record belonging to Kinkaid.

Kinkaid offers multiple sports per each sports season (fall, winter and spring). In the fall, it offers football (boys only), cross country, volleyball, cheerleading and field hockey (girls only). In the winter, it offers soccer, basketball, wrestling (boys only) and swimming. In the spring, they offer lacrosse, baseball (boys only), softball (girls only), track & field, tennis and golf.

Arts 
Kinkaid offers a variety of courses in the performing and visual arts to its Upper and Middle School students. The performing arts include dance, acting, choir, band, and orchestra. The latter three each put on multiple performances throughout the year, as well as performing together in the annual holiday concert. In addition to these courses, there are extracurricular groups that Upper School students may audition for: Encore, Acting Company, and Dance Company.

The visual arts courses include drawing & illustration, painting, printmaking, photography, film, and ceramics.

Every spring, the Upper School puts on a musical for which all students, freshmen through seniors, may audition. Recent productions include Les Miserables, The Sound of Music, Chicago, A Chorus Line, Fiddler on the Roof, and Hairspray. The Middle School also puts on an annual musical production with the seventh and eighth graders.

Arts students can participate in the annual ISAS Arts Festival, a program that gathers schools from across the southwest to enable students to showcase their talents and artwork. In 2009, Kinkaid hosted the festival and was scheduled to host again in 2021; however, that year's festival was cancelled due to COVID-19 related issues.

History

The School was founded in 1906 by Margaret Hunter Kinkaid. When the School was first established, it was located in the dining room of Margaret Hunter Kinkaid's house, which was at the intersection of Elgin and San Jacinto in what is now Midtown Houston. Tuition at the School ranged from $90 per year for first and second grades to $130 per year for sixth graders. Tuition for the 2016–2017 school year was $20,500 for Pre-K through Grade 4, $23,720 for Grades 5 through 8, and $25,000 for Grades 9 through 12. Books, lunch, and a one-time $1000 new student fee are not included.

The Richmond Campus

The School's second location was at the intersection of Richmond and Graustark in the Neartown neighborhood. The School moved to this location in the fall of 1924. The School had its first Open House that year to celebrate the new facility. This tradition continues today. Kinkaid also added its upper school program beginning in the late 1920s. After more than thirty years, the school eventually outgrew its campus and was forced to look for a new location. The administration bought land in Piney Point Village. When the School moved, most of the buildings built by Kinkaid on the Richmond campus were torn down by the new tenants. Some of the old Kinkaid buildings remained for many years, but all had been torn down by 2005.

Piney Point Village campus
Since 1957 and through the present day, the School has been situated on a  site in the city of Piney Point Village, an enclave of Houston, at the junction of 201 Kinkaid School Drive and San Felipe. Kinkaid introduced uniforms for its lower and middle school students beginning in the early 1960s. Upper school students have never been required to wear uniforms. Beginning in 1970, Kinkaid adopted what was known as an "open enrollment" policy.

Beginning in the early 1990s, the campus began a large construction program in an effort to modernize its facilities. A new lower school building was constructed, and the old building was torn down, along with the "little" gym and lower school art and science buildings. A new middle school building was also constructed, and the existing upper school was expanded into the old middle school building. A new auditorium and cafeteria were built, and the remaining campus buildings were renovated.

In addition to the physical changes on campus, the fifth grade was moved from lower school to middle school.

Current and prior heads of school
Jonthan Eades is now serving as the School's sixth head of school.

Margaret Hunter Kinkaid, the School's founder, served as the first headmistress. She was a public school teacher before founding The Kinkaid School. Kinkaid left the public school system when she discovered that married women were not as welcome as public school teachers in her school district. Kinkaid was the headmistress of the School from its founding until 1951. Her son William W. Kinkaid was the principal of the upper school. In 1951 both she and her son retired from their duties at Kinkaid.

Mrs. Kinkaid was succeeded as head by John H. Cooper, who stayed with the School for over two decades. He initiated annual productions of Gilbert and Sullivan operettas, starting with H. M. S. Pinafore. Cooper helped move the campus from its Richmond location to the current Memorial site. Cooper left to co-found The John Cooper School in Woodlands in 1972.

Glenn Ballard was recruited to replace Cooper in 1972. Ballard had previously been headmaster at Dallas' Hockaday School. Ballard retired after 24 years.

Donald C. North was recruited to replace Ballard. North had previously been headmaster at  North Carolina's Durham Academy, with earlier teaching and administrative stints at Kinkaid, Fort Worth Country Day School, and Dallas' St. Mark's School of Texas. North led Kinkaid from 1996–2013.

Andrew D. Martire was appointed Kinkaid’s fifth headmaster in 2013 after having been recruited from being headmaster at Baltimore's Calvert School. The School’s Board of Trustees announced Dr. Martire’s departure in an email in June 2018.

Edward M. Trusty Jr. was appointed by the School's Board of Trustees as the interim head of school in June 2018, after serving as assistant head of school since June 2014. Dr. Trusty left Kinkaid in the summer of 2020 after Jonathan Eades was appointed the new head of school.

The Kinkaid School Archives

The Kinkaid School Archives contain the historical materials of The Kinkaid School including some of the earliest records of founder Margaret H. Kinkaid, as well as yearbooks, scrapbooks, newspapers, and photographic materials.

The Archives became the repository of the School in 2005 when a committee of school faculty, staff, and volunteers began collecting and organizing the materials. Located in the Upper School Moran Library, the Archives has since grown to a collection of faculty manuscripts, school administrative records, athletics records, architectural plans, early student records, present-day digital records, and some of the earliest class photos. The Archives are accessible to the general public.

Special Collections

The holdings of the archives include:

 The Margaret Kinkaid Papers
 The John Cooper Papers
 The Charles B. Sanders Papers
 The Kinkaidian (1946 to present)
 The Kinkaid Kronikle
 The Kinkaid Falcon
 Falcon Wings
 The Kinkaid Magazine
 Commencement Programs
 Centennial Materials
 Athletics Records
 Alumni Collections
 Alumni Publications Collections
 Historical photographs collection

Academics

In a 2015 national survey, Kinkaid was one of the 50 "Smartest Private Schools in the United States."

Kinkaid is also known for its quiz bowl team. Their team was ranked first place nationally in the 2021-2022 season. George W. Bush was also known to have been involved in quiz bowl during his brief tenure at Kinkaid.

"The Tipping Point" controversy
On November 11, 2009, a Kinkaid parent, Hugh "Skip" McGee III, sent an irate letter (entitled "The Tipping Point") to the School's board of trustees. An investment banker, McGee was angry that a teacher’s comment about bankers had upset his son. The letter led to tension among the student body in response to the letter's reference to the student body president dressing in drag for a skit used during his campaign.

In popular culture
Philip Roth's novel, Exit Ghost, features a character who is described as having been a valedictorian at Kinkaid, prior to attending Harvard.

In 1998, the movie Rushmore filmed scenes at Kinkaid. St. John's alumnus Wes Anderson used the now demolished Lower School Building for scenes set in an elementary school.

Notable alumni

 James A. Baker III
 Robert L. Bradley, Jr. (Class of 1973)
 George W. Bush
 Jeb Bush
 Lauren Bush (Class of 2002)
 John Cassidy
 Adam Ereli (Class of 1978)
 Clark Ervin (Class of 1977)
 William P. Hobby, Jr.
 David Hornsby (Class of 1994)
 Katherine Howe (Class of 1995)
 Eric Ladin (Class of 1996)
 Jeff Martin
 Carolyn McCormick (Class of 1977)
 G. Philip Stephenson (Class of 1983)
 Patrick F. Taylor (Class of 1955)
 Stephen Wrabel (Class of 2007)
 Raevyn Rogers (Class of 2014)

References

External links

 
 Architectural information on the Kinkaid Theatre's Brown Auditorium
Article from Stage Directions magazine about the Kinkaid Theatre

Independent Schools Association of the Southwest
Educational institutions established in 1906
Private K-12 schools in Harris County, Texas
1906 establishments in Texas